Edmonton/Villeneuve (Rose Field) Aerodrome  is a private aerodrome located  southeast of Villeneuve in Sturgeon County, Alberta, Canada.

See also
List of airports in the Edmonton Metropolitan Region

References

External links
Place to Fly on COPA's Places to Fly airport directory

Registered aerodromes in Alberta
Aviation in Edmonton
Sturgeon County